"Noravank" Foundation was established in 2001 with an aim to conduct strategic researches in cooperation with Armenian and foreign senior staff, to analyse the problems of the Armenian community, Armenology and the "church-state-society" relations.

The Noravank Foundation also carries out an educational program to inform young researchers about up to date ideas prevailing in social and political sciences via the seminars and conferences, the multi-language journal of "21st Century" and "Noravank Foundation Bulletin".

Publications
Among the researches published by the Noravank are:
The Armenians and Baku (in Russian), 2007, by Khachatur Dadaian
The Armenian Question and the Armenian Genocide, 2006, by Arman Kirakossian
Some issues on Armenians’ ethnogeny, 2006, by Armen Petrosyan
The problems of economic security: methodology and results, 2005, by Ashot Markosyan; etc.
ANALYTICAL CENTERS OF THE REGION (Georgia, Azerbaijan, Turkey), Arestakes Simavoryan, Anushavan Barseghyan, Jonni Melikyan, 2015.
CENTERS FOR ARMENIAN STUDIES ABROAD: ASSESSMENT OF POTENTIAL, Arestakes Simavoryan, Vahram Hovyan, Tigran Ghanalanyan, 2014.
ARMENIAN CATHOLIC AND EVANGELICAL COMMUNITIES IN TURKEY: MODERN TENDENCIES, Arestakes Simavoryan, Vahram Hovyan, 2012.
SCIENTIFIC AND ANALYTICAL COMMUNITY OF THE ARMENIAN DIASPORA. Organizational matters and cooperation prospects, Arestakes Simavoryan, Vahram Hovyan, Tigran Ghanalanyan, Gagik Harutyunyan, 2013.
CONFESSIONAL AND RELIGIOUS ORIENTATIONS OF THE ARMENIANS IN RUSSIAN FEDERATION, Arestakes Simavoryan, Vahram Hovyan, 2011.
ISSUES OF THE ARMENIAN COMMUNITIES IN EASTERN EUROPE, Anna Jhamakochyan, Arestakes Simavoryan, Vahram Hovyan, Diana Galstyan, etc.; 2011.
PROBLEMS AND POSSIBILITIES OF THE CONFESSIONAL SEGMENTS OF DIASPORA, Arestakes Simavoryan, Vahram Hovyan, Hovhannes Hovhannisyan, Ruben Melkonyan, etc.; 2011.
ARMENIAN COMMUNITY IN THE USA, Haykaram Nahapetyan, Arestakes Simavoryan, Karen Veranyan, Tigran Ghanalanyan, 2010.
SOME MAIN ISSUES OF THE ARMENIANS IN JAVAKHQ The study of the religious and information situation of the Armenians in Javakhq, Arestakes Simavoryan, Vahram Hovyan, 2009.

External links

Think tanks based in Armenia